Rum Bridge Branch is a  long 2nd order tributary to Deep Creek in Sussex County, Delaware.  This is the only stream of this name in the United States.

Course
Rum Bridge Branch rises on the Raccoon Branch divide at McDonalds Crossroads, Delaware, and then flows west-northwest to join Deep Creek about 1 mile northeast of Old Furnace.

Watershed
Rum Bridge Branch drains  of area, receives about 45.1 in/year of precipitation, has a wetness index of 667.16, and is about 33% forested.

See also
List of rivers of Delaware

References

Rivers of Delaware
Rivers of Sussex County, Delaware